Naval Cathedral may refer to the following:

Russian naval cathedrals
Naval cathedrals in the Russian tradition are dedicated to Saint Nicholas, a patron saint of sailors. They include:
St. Nicholas Naval Cathedral in Saint Petersburg (1753-62)
Naval Cathedral in Kronstadt (1903-1913)
St Nicholas Naval Cathedral, Karosta (1901-1903)

Other
Naval Cathedral (Biliran), the seat of the Roman Catholic bishops of Naval in the Philippines